Dallara or Dallara Automobili is an Italian chassis manufacturer for various motor racing series.

Dallara or Dall'Ara may also refer to:
Stadio Renato Dall'Ara, a stadium in Bologna, Italy

People with the surname
Charles Dallara, American banker
Gian Paolo Dallara (born 1936), Italian businessman and motorsports engineer, owner of Dallara Automobili above
Tony Dallara (born 1936), stage name of Antonio Lardera, Italian former singer, actor and television personality

See also

 Ara (disambiguation)
 Dall (disambiguation)
 Dalla (disambiguation)